Ecology is the third studio album by American rock band Rare Earth. It was released in 1970 on Rare Earth Records.

Production
The album contains a cover of "Eleanor Rigby" by The Beatles. "Long Time Leavin'" was similar in feel to Crosby, Stills & Nash' "Long Time Gone" and received a fair amount of attention on the newly burgeoning FM radio format. This succeeded in giving the band further credibility. And they earned their second Top 10 chart success with a cover of The Temptations' "(I Know) I'm Losing You".

Ever since 1967, the Summer of Love, songs like "Born to Wander" and "Long Time Leavin'", were descriptive of the nomadic teen and college youth culture sweeping across the United States and Europe. This gave the album contemporary gravitas. Ecology was possibly Rare Earth's most consistent album, showing the band at the height of their artistry and credibility.

Track listing

Side one
 "Born To Wander" (Tom Baird) – 3:20
 "Long Time Leavin'" (Baird) – 4:42
 "(I Know) I'm Losing You" (Cornelius Grant, Eddie Holland, Norman Whitfield) – 10:50

Side two
 "Satisfaction Guaranteed" (Baird) – 4:34
 "Nice Place To Visit" (John Persh) – 3:57
 "No. 1 Man" (Baird) – 4:48
 "Eleanor Rigby" (John Lennon, Paul McCartney) – 6:34

Personnel
Rare Earth
Gil Bridges – flute, saxophone, tambourine, vocals
Eddie Guzman – conga
Kenny James – organ
John Persh – bass, trombone, vocals
Rod Richards – guitar, vocals
Pete Rivera – drums, vocals

References

Rare Earth (band) albums
1970 albums
Albums produced by Norman Whitfield
Albums recorded at Hitsville U.S.A.
Motown albums